Baraboi River may refer to:

 Baraboi River (Black Sea) - runs to the Black Sea in Odessa Oblast, Ukraine
 Baraboi River (Vameș), tributary of the Vameș River in Romania

See also
 Baraboi (disambiguation)